Thumeries is a commune in the Nord department in northern France.

Heraldry

Notable people
Louis Malle (1932–1995), film director, screenwriter and producer

See also
Communes of the Nord department

References

Communes of Nord (French department)
French Flanders